Wandering Star (original title: Étoile errante) is a novel  by French Nobel laureate writer J. M. G. Le Clézio. The novel tells the story of two teenage girls on the threshold and in the aftermath of World War II. Esther, a French Jew who flees for Jerusalem with her mother just after Italy's occupation of a small section of south-east France ended during World War II; and Nejma, a young Arab orphaned and unable to return to the ancient city of her birth, Akka, after the Israeli declaration of statehood. Esther emigrates to the newborn state of Israel, where she encounters another group of refugees, this time Palestinian.

Plot summary
In the year 1944 in a mountainous area on the French-Italian border Esther and her mother and all the Jews in the village of Saint-Martin must cross from France to Italy to avoid the SS. After the war, she and her mother, Elizabeth, begin their long journey to France, to the sailing ship Sette Fratelli which will take them to Palestine. When Esther finally arrives in Jerusalem, she briefly meets and exchanges names with Nejma, a Palestinian, another wanderer, one who ends up, in the summer of 1948, in the Nour Chams Refugee Camp.

Political elements
According to one reviewer  Wandering Star could have been an affecting novel if Le Clézio had written solely of the  Palestinian or Jewish refugees. In the French newspaper Le Monde Pierre Lepape put forward that  Le Clézio "goes much farther than that, much deeper;" in that  Le Clézio's writing looks at the pivotal points of life itself for signs of trouble as much his writing looks for hope of peace (even confronting both time and the elements). Le Clézio's writing  seeks by way of the sun and by way of the earth (being born and the process of death), prodding into the mystery of the origin of everything (despite not knowing the future) towards a need to forget as well as a need to remember (without these needs nothing is repairable)

References

1992 French novels
Novels by J. M. G. Le Clézio
Novels about orphans
Novels set during World War II
Works by J. M. G. Le Clézio
Éditions Gallimard books